Mamuka Mdinaradze (born 24 November 1978) is a Georgian politician and jurist. Mdinaradze graduated from the Law Faculty of the Tbilisi State University in 2000. In 2005, he became member of the Georgian Bar Association and a defense lawyer specializing in the criminal law. He worked in several law firms before establishing his own in 2015. During this year he was given an academic title of Doctor of Law. In 2016, Mdinaradze entered the politics, joining the ruling Georgian Dream party. He was the Georgian Dream majoritarian candidate for Didi Digomi constituency during the 2016 parliamentary elections, managing to secure victory with 51.7% of the vote. Since then, Mdinaradze has served as the member of the Parliament of Georgia. In 2020, he was reelected to Parliament by party list, bloc: "Georgian Dream – Democratic Georgia". In Parliament, he served as chairman of Georgian Dream faction from 2016 to 2019 and from 2020 to this day, as well as majority leader from 2019 to 2020.

External links
Mamuka Mdinaradze on official website of Parliament of Georgia
Mamuka Mdinaradze on official website of National Parliamentary Library of Georgia

Living people
1978 births
Members of the Parliament of Georgia
Politicians from Georgia (country)
21st-century politicians from Georgia (country)
Jurists from Georgia (country)
Georgian Dream politicians